Starcom: The U.S. Space Force is a 1987 animated syndicated television series inspired by a motorized toy franchise manufactured by Coleco. The characters were adapted for animation by series creator Brynne Stephens, who also story edited the show. Starcom was produced by DIC Animation City and distributed by Coca-Cola Telecommunications. The plot detailed the adventures of an American astronaut brigade as they fought off attempted invasions by Shadow Force, a nasty collection of humans and robots led by the nefarious Emperor Dark. The toy line was popular in Europe and Asia, but was unsuccessful in the North American domestic market.

The show was developed with the help of the Young Astronauts’ Council, with the original intention of sparking young viewers’ interest in the NASA Space Program.

The show earned poor ratings, and was cancelled after 13 episodes. The series was rerun in the late 1990s as part of DIC and Pax TV's "Cloud Nine" programming strand.

Toys
Like many 1980s toys, the development of the Starcom toy line preceded the development of the cartoon series.

Starcom: The U.S. Space Force debuted on television screens in 1987, and the toy line hit stores around the same time. There was plenty of variety for the pint-sized empire builder to choose from: the complete series of Starcom toys offered 23 figures, 6 playsets, and 13 vehicles on the Starcom side, while the Shadow Force was represented by 15 action figures and 11 vehicles. The action figures were two inches tall and came packaged with a backpack, a weapon, and identification cards that explained who they were and what their equipment could do. Like the figures, the vehicles and playsets benefited from a sleek, attractive design.

The most unusual aspect of the Starcom toy line was its use of Magna Lock technology. The action figures had tiny magnets implanted in their feet. Not only did this allow them to stand on the vehicles and playsets without falling off, but it also activated devices in the playsets. For instance, if one placed a figure in the elevator of the Starbase Station playset, its Magna Lock magnets would cause the elevator to rise to the top by itself. On the same playset, if one put a figure within a cannon, the Magna Lock magnets would activate a mechanism that made it turn and fire its rockets.

The vehicles and playsets also delivered Power Deploy features, which uses automatic wind up mechanisms that allows them to perform multiple actions all in a touch of a button, without the use of batteries. For example, with the touch of a button, the Starcom StarWolf unfolds its front, and both its wings. All in all, they offered plenty of moving parts (hidden compartments, cannons, folding wings, etc.). Starcom toys never caught on in the U.S. due to poor promotion and the fact that its parent show only lasted a year in syndication. They were discontinued after two years but ended up doing very well in Europe, where both the show and the toys continued to be popular long after the American toys. The toys were successful and hugely popular in Europe and Southeast Asia only after coming under the production and promotion of Mattel. That company removed the US flag and NASA details from the Coleco originals and launched the toys with a second line of promotions in the early 1990s.

Cast

Starcom
 Philip Akin: Colonel John "Slim" Griffin
 Yank Azman
 Robert Cait: Colonel Paul "Crowbar" Corbin
 Rob Cowan: Colonel James "Dash" Derringer
 Don Francks: Admiral Franklin Brickley
 Susan Roman: Lieutenant Kelsey Carver

Shadow Force
 Louis DiBianco: Major Romak
 Marvin Goldhar: General Von Dar
 Dan Hennessey: Major Klag
 Elva Mai Hoover: Malvanna Wilde
 Robert Cait: General Torvek
 Neil Munro: Emperor Dark

Episode list

Home video releases
In 2003, Sterling Entertainment released Starcom: The Search for Aliens on DVD containing 3 episodes.

In February 2015, Mill Creek Entertainment released Starcom: The U.S. Space Force- The Complete Series on DVD in Region 1 for the very first time.

Defenders

Defenders in StarCom are divided into three categories:

 Admiral Franklin Brickley (custom figure) / Starcom Director

Astro Marines
 Col. Paul "Crowbar" Corbin / Battle-Group Commander
 Capt. Vic "Dakota" Hayes / Laser RAT Driver
 Capt. Tim "Ranger" Murphy (custom figure) / Squad Leader; Missile Fox Driver 

 Capt. Rick Ruffing / M-6 "Railgunner" GAV Driver
 Staff Sgt. "Champ" O`Ryan / HARV-7 Driver
 Sgt. "Bear" (custom figure) / Covert Ops; Skyroller Driver 
 Sgt. "Hammer" (custom figure) / Reconnaissance; Missile Fox Gunner
 Sgt. Hector Morales / Squad Leader
 Sgt. Victor Rivera / Squad Leader
 Sgt. Bill Travers / Laser RAT Gunner
 Pfc. Al "Cannon" Evans / HARV-7 Gunner
 Pfc. John "Cowboy" Jefferson / M-6 GAV Gunner

Starbase Command
 Col. John "Slim" Griffin / Battle-Group Commander
 Maj. Tony Barona / SC-Headquarters Commander
 Capt. David "Hawk" Hartford (custom figure) / Gunner; Ring Station Docking Officer 
 Capt. Pete Yablonsky / SC-Headquarters Docking Officer
 Lt. "Lone Wolf" (custom figure) / Gunnery Officer; Medic 
 Sgt. Maj. "Bull" Gruff / SB-Cargo Station Chief
 Sgt. Maj. "Tiger" (custom figure)
 Pfc. Rusty Caldwell / SB-Cargo Station Gunner
 Pfc. Shawn Reed / SB-Cargo Station Fuel Pumper

Star Wing
 Col. James "Dash" Derringer / Battle-Group Commander
 Capt. Rip Malone / Starmax Bomber TMC Pilot
 Capt. Steve "Hotshot" Stockton (custom figure) / Six-Shooter Pilot
 Capt. "Secret" Swofford (custom figure) / Sidewinder Pilot
 Capt. "Yank" (custom figure) / Tornado Gunship Pilot
 Lt. "Bomber" (custom figure) / Double-Fighter Pilot
 Lt. Jeff "Bronx" Carrier / Starhawk SFB Pilot
 Lt. Bob T. Rogers / Starmax Bomber TMC Navigator
 Lt. Tom "Bandit" Waldron / F-1400 Starwolf Pilot
 Sgt. Bob Anders / Battlecrane Pilot
 Sgt. Red Baker / Starmax Bomber TMC Weapons-Chief
 Sgt. Ed Kramer / Starhawk SFB Gunner
 Sgt. "Speed" (custom figure) / Tornado Gunship Weapons-Chief

Vehicles

Astro-Marines
 Laser RAT (#) - Rapid Assault Tracker / (Capt. Vic "Dakota" Hayes; Sgt. Bill Travers)
 M-6 "Railgunner" GAV (#) - Ground Attack Vehicle / (Capt. Rick Ruffing; PFC John "Cowboy" Jefferson)
 HARV-7 - Heavy Armored Recovery Vehicle / (Staff Sgt. "Champ" O`Ryan; PFC Al "Cannon" Evans)
 Missile Fox (#) - Tactical Launching Vehicle / (Capt. Tim "Ranger" Murphy; Sgt. Hammer)
 Skyroller - High-Rising Supertank / ("Sgt. Bear")

(#) - transportable by larger vehicles.

Star Wing
 Starmax Bomber TMC - Transport & Missile Cruiser / (Capt. Rip Malone; Lt. Bob T. Rogers; Sgt. Red Baker)
 Starhawk SFB - Strategic Fighter-Bomber / (Lt. Jeff "Bronx" Carrier; Sgt. Ed Kramer)
 F-1400 Starwolf (#) - Flexwing Astro Fighter / (Lt. Tom "Bandit" Waldron)
 Battlecrane (#) - Combat Cargo Lifter / (Sgt. Bob Anders)
 Double Fighter - Massive Attack Jet / (Lt. "Bomber")
 Sidewinder (#) - High-Speed "Jackknife" Fighter / (Capt. "Secret" Swofford)  
 Six-Shooter - Multi-Deployment Fighter / (Capt. Steve "Hotshot" Stockton)
 Tornado Gunship (#) - Aerospace Transcopter / (Capt. "Yank"; Sgt. "Speed") 

(#) - transportable by larger vehicles.

Playsets
 Starbase Station - Strategic Deployment Platform / (Sergeant Major "Bull" Gruff; PFC Rusty Caldwell; PFC Shawn Reed)
 Starbase Command - Headquarters / (Major Tony Barona; Captain Pete Yablonsky)
 Prefabricated Planetary Fortress - comprises A thru D
 (A) Command Post (#) - Mobile Action Pod
 (B) Laser Artillery (#) - Mobile Action Pod
 (C) Medical Bay (#) - Mobile Action Pod
 (D) Vehicle Repair (#) - Mobile Action Pod
 Big Cannon Fortress (#) - Mobile Action Pod
 Missile Station (#) - Mobile Action Pod

(#) - transportable by larger vehicles.

Invaders

The Shadow Force is divided into three groups:

 Supreme Emperor Dark (special edition figure) / Shadow Force Dictator

Invasion Force
 General Von Dar / Attack-Force Commander
 Maj. Romak / Shadow Invader Driver
 Capt. Pannok (custom figure) / Shadow Upriser Driver 
 Lt. Gorn (custom figure) / Shadow Mini-Tank Driver 
 Lt. Vasor (custom figure) / Shadow Blast-Track Driver
 Sgt. Borek / Attack Leader
 Sgt. Hack / Shadow Raider Gunner
 Cpl. Slash / Trooper
 Cpl. Storn / Shadow Invader Gunner

Starmada
 General Malvanna Wilde (custom figure) / Attack-Force Commander 
 Maj. Klag / Shadowbat Pilot
 Capt. Howl (custom figure) / Counter-Insurgency; Shadow Spy Pilot 
 Capt. Mace / Shadow Vampire Pilot
 Lt. Magg / Shadow Parasite Pilot
 Sgt. Ramor / Shadowbat Weapons Master
 Sgt. Von Rodd / Shadow Vampire Gunner

Robot-Drone Force
 General Torvek / Attack-Force Commander
 Capt. Battlecron-9 / Shadow Raider Driver
 Capt. Hydrone (custom figure)
 Capt. Tox (custom figure)  
 Lt. Zortek (custom figure) / Gunner; Shadow Bandit Pilot
 Sergeant-Major Ivok (custom figure) / Shadow Attack-Trike Driver
 Sergeant-Major Targon (custom figure) / Gunner 
 Cpl. Agon-6 / Shadow Raider Gunner
 Cpl. Cronax (custom figure)

Vehicles

Invasion
 Shadow Invader (#) - Rapid Strike Vehicle / (Maj. Romak; Cpl. Storn)
 Shadow Blast Track - Enemy Tank/Transport / (Lt. Vasor)
 Shadow Upriser - Elevating Land Vehicle / (Capt. Pannok)
 Shadow Mini-Tank (#) / (Lt. Gorn)

(#) - transportable by larger vehicles.

Starmada
 Shadowbat - Battle Cruiser / (Maj. Klag; Sgt. Ramor)
 Shadow Parasite (#) - Attack Fighter / (Lt. Magg)
 Shadow Vampire - Enemy V.T.O.L. Fighter / (Capt. Mace; Sgt. Von Rodd)
 Shadow Spy (#) - Disguised Enemy / (Capt. Howl)

(#) - transportable by larger vehicles.

Robot-Drone
 Shadow Raider - Sneak Attack Vehicle / (Capt. Battlecron-9; Sgt. Hack; Cpl. Agon-6)
 Shadow Bandit - Enemy Pod Lifter / (Lt. Zortek)
 Shadow Attack-Trike (#) / (Sgt. Maj. Ivok)

References

External links
 

1987 American television series debuts
1987 American television series endings
1980s American animated television series
1980s American science fiction television series
American children's animated science fiction television series
American children's animated space adventure television series
1980s toys
Action figures
Television shows about the United States Space Force
Television series by DIC Entertainment
English-language television shows
Television series by Sony Pictures Television